Conoplectus is a genus of ant-loving beetles in the family Staphylinidae. There are about five described species in Conoplectus.

Species
These five species belong to the genus Conoplectus:
 Conoplectus acornus Carlton, 1983
 Conoplectus bicentennialus Carlton, 1983
 Conoplectus canaliculatus (LeConte, 1849)
 Conoplectus excavoides Carlton, 1983
 Conoplectus susae Carlton, 1983

References

Further reading

 
 
 

Pselaphinae
Articles created by Qbugbot